Jeremy Rea Jackson (born September 19, 1982) is an American former mixed martial artist from California.

Career 
Jackson's first professional MMA fight was on September 9, 2001, against Jake Shields in the Gladiator Challenge 6: Caged Beasts. Jackson has fought in The Ultimate Fighting Championship, Kage Kombat, IFC, King of the Cage, Ultimate Athlete, World Extreme Cagefighting, Gladiator Challenge, Ring Of Honor, and Total Combat. Jeremy Jackson had a trilogy with Nick Diaz. He won via knockout in their first fight, the trilogy ended with him losing two straight to Diaz, the latter loss coming at UFC 44: Undisputed. He competed as a welterweight on The Ultimate Fighter 4 on Spike TV, but was sent home before having a chance to fight after violating the rules of the show.

Although ejected from the tournament, Jackson fought Pete Spratt in the fourth season finale of The Ultimate Fighter. Jackson submitted due to  a neck injury in the second round and was released from the UFC.

On June 30, 2008, Jackson was arrested and taken into custody by the Ventura County Sheriff's Office. He was charged with multiple counts of aggravated rape and held on $1 million bail.

Jackson was sentenced to 25 years to life after pleading guilty to the rape charges against his lawyer's advice.

Mixed martial arts record 

|-
| Win
| align=center| 9–5
| Hector Carrilo
| TKO (punches)
| Total Combat 19
| 
| align=center| 1
| align=center| N/A
| 
| 
|-
| Loss
| align=center| 8–5
| Pete Spratt
| TKO (neck injury)
| The Ultimate Fighter: The Comeback Finale
| 
| align=center| 2
| align=center| 1:11
| 
| 
|-
| Win
| align=center| 8–4
| Christian Vargas
| Submission (rear-naked choke)
| TC 10: Total Combat 10
| 
| align=center| 1
| align=center| 3:56
| 
| 
|-
| Win
| align=center| 7–4
| Mark Moreno
| Submission (rear-naked choke)
| ROH 1: Ring of Honor 1
| 
| align=center| 1
| align=center| 1:30
| 
| 
|-
| Loss
| align=center| 6–4
| Nick Diaz
| Submission (armbar)
| UFC 44
| 
| align=center| 3
| align=center| 2:04
| 
| 
|-
| Loss
| align=center| 6–3
| Nick Diaz
| TKO (punches)
| IFC WC 18: Big Valley Brawl
| 
| align=center| 1
| align=center| 4:17
| 
| 
|-
| Win
| align=center| 6–2
| Shonie Carter
| Decision (unanimous)
| WEC 6
| 
| align=center| 3
| align=center| 5:00
| 
| 
|-
| Win
| align=center| 5–2
| Nick Diaz
| TKO (punches)
| UA 4: King of the Mountain
| 
| align=center| 1
| align=center| 0:49
| 
| 
|-
| Win
| align=center| 4–2
| Mike Penalber
| TKO (punches)
| UA 4: King of the Mountain
| 
| align=center| 1
| align=center| N/A
| 
| 
|-
| Win
| align=center| 3–2
| Zach Light
| TKO (punches)
| UA 4: King of the Mountain
| 
| align=center| 2
| align=center| N/A
| 
| 
|-
| Win
| align=center| 2–2
| Eddy Ellis
| TKO (punches)
| IFC WC 17: Warriors Challenge 17
| 
| align=center| 1
| align=center| 2:24
| 
| 
|-
| Loss
| align=center| 1–2
| Joe Stevenson
| TKO (submission to punches)
| KOTC 15: Bad Intentions
| 
| align=center| 1
| align=center| 1:27
| 
| 
|-
| Win
| align=center| 1–1
| Peter Delayo
| TKO (strikes)
| KK: Kage Kombat
| 
| align=center| N/A
| align=center| N/A
| 
| 
|-
| Loss
| align=center| 0–1
| Jake Shields
| Submission (rear-naked choke)
| GC 6: Caged Beasts
| 
| align=center| 1
| align=center| 2:03
| 
|

References

External links 
 
 

1982 births
Living people
American male mixed martial artists
American sportspeople convicted of crimes
Mixed martial artists from California
Sportspeople from Oxnard, California
Welterweight mixed martial artists
American people convicted of rape
People from Port Hueneme, California
Sportspeople from Ventura County, California
Ultimate Fighting Championship male fighters